Haskell County is a county located in the U.S. state of Texas. As of the 2020 census, its population was 5,416. The county seat is Haskell. The county was created in 1858 and later organized in 1885. It is named for Charles Ready Haskell, who was killed in the Goliad massacre.

Geography

Major highways
  U.S. Highway 277
  U.S. Highway 380
  State Highway 6
  State Highway 222

Adjacent counties
 Knox County (north)
 Throckmorton County (east)
 Shackelford County (southeast)
 Jones County (south)
 Stonewall County (west)
 Baylor County (northeast)
 King County (northwest)

Demographics

Note: the US Census treats Hispanic/Latino as an ethnic category. This table excludes Latinos from the racial categories and assigns them to a separate category. Hispanics/Latinos can be of any race.

As of the census of 2000, 6,093 people, 2,569 households, and 1,775 families resided in the county.  The population density was 8 people per square mile (3/km2).  The 3,555 housing units averaged 4 per square mile (2/km2).  The racial makeup of the county was 82.78% White, 2.79% Black or African American, 0.54% Native American, 0.15% Asian, 0.02% Pacific Islander, 11.67% from other races, and 2.05% from two or more races.  About 20% of the population was Hispanic or Latino of any race.

Of the 2,569 households, 27.40% had children under the age of 18 living with them, 57.60% were married couples living together, 8.80% had a female householder with no husband present, and 30.90% were not families. About 29.4% of all households were made up of individuals, and 18.30% had someone living alone who was 65 years of age or older.  The average household size was 2.33 and the average family size was 2.86.

In the county, the population distributed as 23.70% under the age of 18, 5.70% from 18 to 24, 22.10% from 25 to 44, 22.90% from 45 to 64, and 25.50% who were 65 years of age or older.  The median age was 44 years. For every 100 females, there were 88.90 males.  For every 100 females age 18 and over, there were 86.30 males.

The median income for a household in the county was $23,690, and for a family was $29,506. Males had a median income of $23,542 versus $16,418 for females. The per capita income for the county was $14,918.  About 16.90% of families and 22.80% of the population were below the poverty line, including 34.00% of those under age 18 and 15.40% of those age 65 or over.

Communities

Cities
 Haskell (county seat)
 O'Brien
 Stamford (small part in Jones County)
 Weinert

Towns
 Rochester
 Rule

Unincorporated communities
 Paint Creek
 Sagerton

Ghost town
 Jud

Politics

Haskell County is the home county of former Texas Governor Rick Perry. Republican Drew Springer, Jr., a businessman from Muenster in Cooke County, has represented Haskell County in the Texas House of Representatives since January 2013.
Haskell County was once a Democratic bastion, voting for the Democratic nominee for President in every election from its founding through 1996, with the exceptions of the 1972 and 1984 Republican landslides. In 2000, it broke its Democratic heritage by voting for Republican nominee George W. Bush. Since then, the county has taken a sharp Republican turn, moving rightward in every subsequent election as of 2020. In 2020, Haskell gave 83.1 percent of the vote to Republican nominee Donald Trump, the highest ever Republican vote share in the county, and just 15.9 percent of the vote to Democratic nominee Joe Biden, the lowest ever Democratic vote share in the county.

Education
School districts serving sections of the county include:
 Haskell Consolidated Independent School District
 Knox City-O'Brien Consolidated Independent School District
 Munday Consolidated Independent School District
 Paint Creek Independent School District
 Rule Independent School District
 Stamford Independent School District

Goree Independent School District formerly served sections of the county. On July 1, 2003 it merged into Munday CISD.

The county is in the service area of Vernon College.

See also

 Double Mountain Fork Brazos River
 Recorded Texas Historic Landmarks in Haskell County

References

External links
 Haskell County government's website
 
 Haskell County Profile from the Texas Association of Counties

 
1885 establishments in Texas
Populated places established in 1885
Rick Perry